Nicholas Clive Jeavons (born ) is a former  international rugby union player. In 1983 he toured with the British and Irish Lions on their tour to New Zealand and at the time played club rugby for Moseley.

References

1957 births
Living people
English rugby union players
British & Irish Lions rugby union players from England
England international rugby union players
Rugby union flankers
Moseley Rugby Football Club players